Kerry Clifford Bryan Jeremy (born 6 February 1980 in Antigua) is a cricketer. He played six One Day Internationals for West Indies from 2000 to 2001.

External links
International player's profile page

1980 births
Living people
West Indies One Day International cricketers
Leeward Islands cricketers
Antigua and Barbuda cricketers
People from Saint George Parish, Antigua and Barbuda